Margarita Silva-Hutner (28 November 1915 – 6 February 2002). was a mycologist, and known as the “Matriarch of Medical Mycology”.

Biography 
Silva-Hutner was born in Rio Piedras, Puerto Rico. She graduated with a B.A. from the University of Puerto Rico in 1936. She then worked at the Columbia University School of Tropical Medicine in San Juan under Arturo L. Carrión for 13 years. Silva-Hunter’s work with Carrión focused on fungal infections, especially chromoblastomycosis. 

Silva-Hutner began attending Harvard University on a scholarship in 1950 and joined the Mycology Laboratory at Columbia-Presbyterian Medical Center later that year. She received her doctorate in 1952. 

In 1956, Silva-Hutner became director of the Mycology Laboratory and an assistant professor in the College of Physicians & Surgeons. She was promoted to associate professor in 1963 and remained on the faculty at Columbia University for over fifty years. She retired from her position as director in 1981 but continued to teach. Silva-Hutner died February 6, 2002, in New York, NY after a lengthy illness.

Personal life 
In 1956, she married Seymour H. Hutner.

Legacy 
Silva-Hutner was a founding member of the Medical Mycological Society of New York. Her research contributed to the development of Nystatin, the first antifungal medicine approved for human use. She served as Chair of the Nomination Committee for the Medical Mycological Society of the Americas at the time of its founding and was active within the organization.

Silva-Hutner’s work on chromoblastomycosis laid the groundwork for further research on this pathogen, which remains among the most difficult fungal infections to manage. She published more than fifty articles on the biology and taxonomy of pathogenic fungi over the course of her career.

Honors and awards 
In 1986 she was the recipient of the Medical Mycological Society of the America’s Rhonda Benham Award. In 1996, she was given an award for “Excellence in Medical Mycology” at a symposium called “A Diagnostic Medley of Medical Mycology.” Silva-Hutner was also a Fellow and Diplomate of the American Board of Medical Microbiology.

References 

Mycologists
People from Río Piedras, Puerto Rico
University of Puerto Rico alumni
Columbia University faculty

1915 births
2002 deaths
Harvard University alumni